The Heartlight Set is a studio album by the rock band Joy Zipper. It was released in 2005 on Vertigo Records.

Track listing 
All songs written by Vincent Cafiso, except where noted:

References

2005 albums
Joy Zipper albums